Gérard Lefranc (born 7 May 1935) is a French fencer. He competed in the team épée event at the 1960 Summer Olympics.

References

External links
 

1935 births
Living people
Sportspeople from Calais
French male épée fencers
Olympic fencers of France
Fencers at the 1960 Summer Olympics